Hill End Hospital was a mental health facility in St Albans in Hertfordshire, England.

History
The hospital, which was designed by George Thomas Hine using a Compact Arrow layout, opened as the Hertfordshire County Asylum in April 1899. The asylum became the Hertfordshire County Mental Hospital in 1920 and the Hill End Hospital for Mental and Nervous Diseases in 1936. During the Second World War patients were evacuated from St Bartholomew's Hospital to Hill End Hospital. It became part of the National Health Service as the Hill End Hospital and Clinic for the Prevention and Treatment of Mental and Nervous Disorders  in 1948.

After the introduction of Care in the Community in the early 1980s, the hospital went into a period of decline and closed in November 1995. The buildings have since been demolished and the site redeveloped for residential use.

References

Defunct hospitals in Hertfordshire
Hospital buildings completed in 1899
Hospitals established in 1899
1899 establishments in England
Former psychiatric hospitals in England
Hospitals disestablished in 1995
1995 disestablishments in England